Falconhurst is a historic mansion in McMinnville, Tennessee, U.S. It was built in 1850 for Asa Faulkner, the owner of textile mills, and a politician who served as a member of the Tennessee House of Representatives and the Tennessee Senate. It was later the private residence of Charles Faulkner Bryan, a composer of folk music who married into the Faulkner family.

The house was designed in the Federal and Greek Revival architectural styles. It has been listed on the National Register of Historic Places since August 26, 1982.

References

Houses on the National Register of Historic Places in Tennessee
Federal architecture in Tennessee
Greek Revival architecture in Tennessee
Houses completed in 1850
National Register of Historic Places in Warren County, Tennessee
1850 establishments in Tennessee